De kloge og vi gale is a 1945 Danish film directed by Lau Lauritzen Jr. and Alice O'Fredericks.

Cast
 Poul Reumert - Jørgen Rhoders
 Anna Borg - Irene
 Poul Reichhardt - Per
 Lily Weiding - Ulla
 Lilian Ellis - Lily Lund
 Petrine Sonne - Fru Steenberg
 Ib Schønberg - Hushovmester Jochumsen
 Knud Heglund - Musikforlægger Børgesen

External links

1945 films
1940s Danish-language films
Danish black-and-white films
Films directed by Lau Lauritzen Jr.
Films directed by Alice O'Fredericks
Films scored by Sven Gyldmark